Tamilvanan  was a Tamil language author and publisher based in Chennai. He was the founding editor of the widely influential magazine Kalkandu; it published fiction, articles about state politics and Tamil cinema, and pages of factoids. It also had a vibrant 'Question and Answers' section, in which the editor's idiosyncrasy was promoted. Tamilvanan and his magazine were closely associated with the Dravidian socio-political movement, although he was a totally non-communal man.

Tamilvanan's novels feature the detective hero Shankarlal, who travels the world solving crimes and battling criminals in countries around the world.  Improbably, he is instantly recognized and mobbed by fans and admirers everywhere he goes.  The novels often contain a good deal of factual information about the settings, which served to educate the Tamil audience about countries to which, at the time, relatively few Indians could obtain visas or afford to travel.

In the books, Shankarlal frequently travels with his wife Indra and his servants, Kathrikai (the nickname means "eggplant", a reference to his fat belly and tuft of hair) and Manickam.  The detective wore a black hat and sunglasses whenever pictured, and was famous for drinking great quantities of tea.

Despite all the foreign settings and situations, Tamilvanan's language was pure Tamil, avoiding common English or Hindi loan words in favor of their Tamil equivalents. Nonetheless, all the hall-marks of a journalistic genius   were visible in his work.

Tamilvanan's original name was Lakshmanan Ramanathan Chettiar.  Tamilvanan is considered a brilliant, original and progressive journalist well ahead of his time. His motto as a journalist was "Courage is the Savior" (in Tamil "Thunivee Thunai").  In his journal Kalkandu, he often substantiated his facts and statistics with authorities such as Encyclopædia Britannica and Guinness Book of World Records besides other scholarly works. In order to obtain more facts, details and statistics on any issue or matter, he often went into the references cited by authoritative works or compendia of information; and so much so, Tamilvanan was considered a journalistic genius well ahead of his time. One of the logos of his journal Kalkandu was a black hat and a pair of black glasses, and this was considered as his symbol.  He always presented fascinating facts and always surprised the reader with his original and thought-provoking ideas.

The publication house (MANIMEKALI PRASURAM) which was started by Tamilvanan is being run by his sons LENA TAMILVANAN and RAVI TAMILVANAN.  His elder son Lena Tamilvanan continues to run his publishing business, and is a noted author and editor in his own right. He is also the editor of the weekly Kalkandu and is the sub-editor of the weekly magazine Kumudam.

Novels/serials 
 Marmamanithan
 Thimingila Theevu
 Sankarlal Thupparigirar
Pathu Per Thediya Pathukodi
153
Karugiya Kadiham
Orangeu Vanna Car
Manidhargal Illadha Theevu
Indru Mudhal Success
Getti Bommulu Ennum Kolliakaran

References

Tamil-language writers
Indian male novelists
Writers from Chennai